Phytoecia nepheloides is a species of beetle in the family Cerambycidae. It was described by Sama in 1997. It is known from Syria.

References

Phytoecia
Beetles described in 1997